The women's 1000 meter at the 2021 KNSB Dutch Single Distance Championships in Heerenveen took place at Thialf ice skating rink on Sunday 1 November 2020.

Statistics

Result

Source:

Referee: Wycher Bos.  Assistant: Björn Fetlaar.  Starter: Raymond Micka 
Start 1-11-2020 16:02:00 until 1-11-2020 16:25:39

Draw

References 

Single Distance Championships
2021 Single Distance
World